Loss of load in an electrical grid is a term used to describe the situation when the available generation capacity is less than the system load. Multiple probabilistic reliability indices for the generation systems are using loss of load in their definitions, with the more popular being Loss of Load Probability (LOLP) that characterizes a probability of a loss of load occurring within a year. Loss of load events are calculated before the mitigating actions (purchasing electricity from other systems, load shedding) are taken, so a loss of load does not necessarily cause a blackout.

Loss-of-load-based reliability indices 
Multiple reliability indices for the electrical generation are based on the loss of load being observed/calculated over a long interval (one or multiple years) in relatively small increments (an hour or a day).
 Loss of load probability (LOLP) is a probability of an occurrence of an increment with a loss of load condition. LOLP can also be considered as a probability of involuntary load shedding;
 Loss of load expectation (LOLE) is the total duration of increments when the loss of load is expected to occur, . Frequently LOLE is specified in days, if the increment is an hour, not a day, a term loss of load hours (LOLH) is sometimes used. Since LOLE uses the daily peak value for the whole day, LOLH (that uses different peak values for each hour) cannot be obtained by simply multiplying LOLE by 24; although in practice the relationship is close to linear, the coefficients vary from network to network;
 Loss of load events (LOLEV) a.k.a. loss of load frequency (LOLF) is the number of loss of load events within the interval (an event can occupy several contiguous increments);
 Loss of load duration (LOLD) characterizes the average duration of a loss of load event:

See also 
 Value of lost load

References

Sources 
 
 
 
 
 
 
 
 
 

Electrical engineering
Reliability indices